The Cirth (meaning "runes"; sg. certh ) is a semi‑artificial script, based on real‑life runic alphabets, one of several scripts invented by J. R. R. Tolkien for the constructed languages he devised and used in his works. Cirth is written with a capital letter when referring to the writing system; the letters themselves can be called cirth.

In the fictional history of Middle-earth, the original Certhas was created by the Sindar (or Grey Elves) for their language, Sindarin. Its extension and elaboration was known as the Angerthas Daeron, as it was attributed to the Sinda Daeron, despite the fact that it was most probably arranged by the Noldor in order to represent the sounds of other languages like Quenya and Telerin.

Although it was later largely replaced by the Tengwar, the Cirth was nonetheless adopted by the Dwarves to write down both their Khuzdul language (Angerthas Moria) and the languages of Men (Angerthas Erebor). The Cirth was also adapted, in its oldest and simplest form, by various races including Men and even Orcs.

External history

Concept and creation

Many letters have shapes also found in the historical runic alphabets, but their sound values are only similar in a few of the vowels. Rather, the system of assignment of sound values is much more systematic in the Cirth than in the historical runes (e.g., voiced variants of a voiceless sound are expressed by an additional stroke). 

The division between the older Cirth of Daeron and their adaptation by Dwarves and Men has been interpreted as a parallel drawn by Tolkien to the development of the Fuþorc to the Younger Fuþark. The original Elvish Cirth "as supposed products of a superior culture" are focused on logical arrangement and a close connection between form and value whereas the adaptations by mortal races introduced irregularities. Similar to the Germanic tribes who had no written literature and used only simple runes before their conversion to Christianity, the Sindarin Elves of Beleriand with their Cirth were introduced to the more elaborate Tengwar of Fëanor when the Noldorin Elves returned to Middle-earth from the lands of the divine Valar.

Internal history and description

Certhas

In the Appendix E to The Return of the King, Tolkien writes that the Sindar of Beleriand first developed an alphabet for their language some time between the invention of the Tengwar by Fëanor (YT 1250) and the introduction thereof to Middle-earth by the Exiled Noldor at the beginning of the First Age.

This alphabet was devised to represent only the sounds of their Sindarin language and its letters were mostly used for inscribing names or brief memorials on wood, stone or metal, hence their angular shapes and straight lines. In Sindarin these letters were named cirth (sing. certh), from the Elvish root *kir- meaning "to cleave, to cut". An abecedarium of cirth, consisting of the runes listed in due order, was commonly known as Certhas (meaning "rune-rows" in Sindarin and loosely translated as "runic alphabet").

The oldest cirth were the following:

The form of these letters was somewhat unsystematic, unlike later rearrangements and extensions that made them more featural. Many of the runes consisted of a single vertical line (or "stem") with an appendage (or "branch") attached to one or both sides. If the attachment was made on one side only, it was usually to the right, but "the reverse was not infrequent" and did not change the value of the letter.

Angerthas Daeron
In Beleriand, before the end of the First Age, the Certhas was rearranged and further developed, partly under the influence of the Tengwar introduced by the Noldor. This reorganisation of the Cirth was commonly attributed to the Elf Daeron, minstrel and loremaster of King Thingol of Doriath. Thus, the new system became known as the Angerthas Daeron (where "angerthas"  is from Sindarin   + "certhas" , meaning "long rune-rows").

In this arrangement, the assignment of values to each certh is systematic. The runes consisting of a stem and a branch attached to the right are used for voiceless stops, while other sounds are allocated according to the following principles:
 adding a stroke to a branch adds voice (e.g.,   →  );
 moving the branch to the left indicates opening to a spirant (e.g.,   →  );
 placing the branch on both sides of the stem adds voice and nasality (e.g.,   →  ).

The cirth constructed in this way can therefore be arranged into series, each corresponding to a place of articulation:

Back to the fictional history, since the new  and  encompass sounds which do not occur in Sindarin but are present in Quenya, they were most probably introduced by the Exiled Noldor who spoke Quenya as a language of knowledge.

By loan-translation, the Cirth became known in Quenya as Certar , while a single certh was called certa .

After the Tengwar became the sole script used for writing, the Angerthas Daeron was essentially relegated to carved inscriptions. The Elves of the West, for the most part, abandoned the Cirth altogether, with the exception of the Noldor dwelling in the country of Eregion, who maintained it in use and made it known as Angerthas Eregion.

 In this article, the runes of the Angerthas come with the same peculiar transliteration used by Tolkien in the Appendix E, which differs from the (Latin) spelling of both Quenya and Sindarin. The IPA transcription that follows is applicable to both languages, except where indicated otherwise.

Notes:

Angerthas Moria

According to Tolkien's legendarium, the Dwarves first came to know the runes of the Noldor at the beginning of the Second Age. The Dwarves "introduced a number of unsystematic changes in value, as well as certain new cirth". They modified the previous system to suit the specific needs of their language, Khuzdul. The Dwarves spread their revised alphabet to Moria, where it came to be known as Angerthas Moria, and developed both carved and pen-written forms of these runes.

Many cirth here represent sounds not occurring in Khuzdul (at least in published words of Khuzdul: of course, our corpus is very limited to judge the necessity or not, of these sounds). Here they are marked with a black star (★).

Notes on Angerthas Moria

Therefore, the certh  (which was previously used for the sound , useless in Khuzdul) was adopted for the sound . Because of the visual relation of these two cirth, the certh  was given the sound  to relate better with  that, in this script, had the sound .

Angerthas Erebor

At the beginning of the Third Age the Dwarves were driven out of Moria, and some migrated to Erebor. As the Dwarves of Erebor would trade with the Men of the nearby towns of Dale and Lake-town, they needed a script to write in Westron (the lingua franca of Middle-earth, usually rendered in English by Tolkien in his works). The Angerthas Moria was adapted accordingly: some new cirth were added, while some were restored to their Elvish usage, thus creating the Angerthas Erebor.

While the Angerthas Moria was still used to write down Khuzdul, this new script was primarily used for Mannish languages. It is also the script used in the first and third page of the Book of Mazarbul.

Angerthas Erebor also features combining diacritics:
a circumflex  used to denote long consonants;
a macron below  to indicate a long vowel sound;
an underdot  to mark cirth used as numerals. As a matter of fact, in the Book of Mazarbul some cirth are used as numerals:  for 1,  for 2,  for 3,  for 4,  for 5.

The Angerthas Erebor is used twice in The Lord of the Rings to write in English:
 in the upper inscription of the title page, where it reads "[dh]ə·lord·ov·[dh]ə·riŋs·translatᵊd·from·[dh]ə·red·b[oo]k' ..." (the sentence follows in the bottom inscription, written in Tengwar: "... of Westmarch by John Ronald Reuel Tolkien. Herein is set forth/ the history of the War of the Ring and the Return of the King as seen by the Hobbits.");
 in the bottom inscription of Balin's tomb—being the translation of the upper inscription, which is written in Khuzdul using Angerthas Moria.

The Book of Mazarbul shows some additional cirth used in Angerthas Erebor: one for a double  ligature, one for the definite article, and six for the representation of the same number of English diphthongs:

Notes on Angerthas Erebor

Other runic scripts by Tolkien 

The Cirth is not the only runic writing system used by Tolkien in his legendarium. In fact, he devised a great number of runic alphabets, of which only a few others have been published. Some of these are included in the "Appendix on Runes" of The Treason of Isengard (The History of Middle-earth, vol. VII), edited by Christopher Tolkien.

Runes from The Hobbit 

According to Tolkien himself, those found in The Hobbit are a form of "English runes" used in lieu of the Dwarvish runes proper. They can be interpreted as an attempt made by Tolkien to adapt the Fuþorc (i.e., the Old English runic alphabet) to the Modern English language.

These runes are basically the same found in Fuþorc, but their sound may change according to their position, just like the letters of the Latin script: the writing mode used by Tolkien is, in this case, mainly orthographic. This means that the system has one rune for each Latin letter, regardless of pronunciation.

A few sounds are instead written with the same rune, without considering the English spelling.

Finally, some runes stand for particular English digraphs and diphthongs.

Here the runes used in The Hobbit are displayed along with their Fuþorc counterpart and corresponding English grapheme:

Notes:

Gondolinic runes
Not all the runes mentioned in The Hobbit are Dwarf-runes. The swords found in the Trolls' cave bore runes that Gandalf could not read. In fact, the swords Glamdring and Orcrist (which were forged in the ancient kingdom of Gondolin) bore a type of letters known as Gondolinic runes. They seem to have become obsolete and been forgotten by the Third Age, and this is supported by the fact that only Elrond could still read the inscriptions on the swords.

Tolkien devised this runic alphabet in a very early stage of his shaping of Middle-earth. Nevertheless, they are known to us from a slip of paper that Tolkien wrote; his son Christopher sent a photocopy of it to Paul Nolan Hyde in February 1992. Hyde published it, with an extensive analysis, in the 1992 Summer issue of Mythlore, no. 69.

The system provides sounds not found in any of the known Elvish languages of the First Age, but perhaps it was designed for a variety of languages. However, the consonants seem to be, more or less, the same found in Welsh phonology, a theory supported by the fact that Tolkien was heavily influenced by Welsh when creating Elvish languages.

Encoding schemes

Unicode
Equivalents for some (but not all) cirth can be found in the Runic block of Unicode.

Tolkien's mode of writing Modern English in Anglo-Saxon runes received explicit recognition with the introduction of his three additional runes to the Runic block with the release of Unicode 7.0, in June 2014. The three characters represent the English ,  and  graphemes, as follows:

A formal Unicode proposal to encode Cirth as a separate script was made in September 1997 by Michael Everson.
No action was taken by the Unicode Technical Committee (UTC) but Cirth appears in the Roadmap to the SMP.

ConScript Unicode Registry

Unicode Private Use Area layouts for Cirth are defined at the ConScript Unicode Registry (CSUR) and the Under-ConScript Unicode Registry (UCSUR).

Two different layouts are defined by the CSUR/UCSUR:
 1997-11-03 proposal implemented by fonts like GNU Unifont and Code2000.
 2000-04-22 discussion paper implemented by fonts like Constructium and Fairfax.

Without proper rendering support, you may see question marks, boxes, or other symbols below instead of Cirth.

See also
List of runestones

References

Middle-earth writing systems
Alphabets
Runology
Runiform scripts
Miscellaneous Unicode blocks